Gamal Kosh Lewis (born January 11, 1988), better known as LunchMoney Lewis, is an American rapper, singer, songwriter, and record producer. He is best known for his 2015 single "Bills", which topped the charts in Australia and peaked within the top 10 in New Zealand and the UK.

Early life
Gamal Lewis was born in Miami, Florida, on January 11, 1988. His father, Ian Lewis, and uncle, Roger Lewis, are both members of the Jamaican reggae group Inner Circle and have a recording studio, Circle House, where artists including Flo Rida and Lil Wayne have recorded. While a teenager, Lewis was given the nickname "LunchMoney" and his start in songwriting by American hip hop producer Salaam Remi.

Career

2014–2015: "Bills" and breakout
Lewis began working with Dr. Luke as a producer and first broke into wide recognition as a rapper after appearing on the song "Trini Dem Girls" from Nicki Minaj's 2014 album The Pinkprint. He also co-wrote Jessie J's single "Burnin' Up" from her album Sweet Talker, and Fifth Harmony's single "Boss" from the album Reflection. In 2015, he released his debut single as a solo artist, "Bills", which peaked at 79 on the Billboard Hot 100 and peaked at number one on the ARIA Charts.

In April 2015, Lewis released a garage rock and funk track titled "Real Thing", which is included on the Bills EP released on April 21. He was also featured on Young Money Yawn's song "Let's Go See Papi", also featuring Pusha T.

2015–present

After the success of the Bills EP, Lewis was inspired to go back into the studio and started to write more music. In August 2015, his first single outside of the Bills EP project, entitled "Whip It!", featuring vocals from Chloe Angelides, was released. It later was accompanied by a music video which was released on September 15, 2015.

Then, in December 2015, he released another single, entitled "Ain't Too Cool". The song later featured in the 2015 video game Madden NFL 16. This sparked much interest on Lewis writing up his debut album.

Coming into 2016, Lewis took part in many collaborations. He featured vocals in Yo Gotti's 2016 single "Again" and collaborated alongside Meghan Trainor on her promotional single "I Love Me" from her 2016 album Thank You.

In April 2017, Lewis joined Pitbull and Flo Rida in performing "Greenlight" at WrestleMania 33.

On June 9, 2017, Lewis featured on Andy Grammer's new single titled "Give Love".

In August 2022, Lewis got his first chart-topper in the United States as a songwriter, due to his credit on Minaj's "Super Freaky Girl".

Discography

Extended plays

Singles

As lead artist

As featured artist

Other charted songs

Guest appearances

Songwriting credits

Notes

References

Musicians from Miami
American hip hop singers
American contemporary R&B singers
American rappers of Jamaican descent
Living people
1988 births
21st-century American rappers
Pop rappers